North Hennepin Community College (NHCC) is a public community college in Brooklyn Park, Minnesota.  It was founded in 1966 and is a member of the Minnesota State Colleges and Universities system.

History 
The college was founded in 1966 as North Hennepin State Junior College, opening concurrently with two other state junior colleges in the Twin Cities metropolitan area, Anoka-Ramsey Community College and Metropolitan State University. North Hennepin operated during its first three years in the former facilities of Osseo Junior High School in Osseo. Classes were first offered in September 1966, with a first semester enrollment of 425 students. The current site in Brooklyn Park was selected in 1967, and the new campus opened in the fall of 1969. The school's name was changed to North Hennepin Community College in 1973.

Academics 
NHCC offers associate degrees as well as certificates. North Hennepin also offers 13 bachelor's degree programs through collaboration with universities in Minnesota. Full degrees for certain majors can be obtained via NHCC and courses required in other majors can also be taken at their campus.

North Hennepin Community College is accredited by the Higher Learning Commission.

Notable alumni
 Bruce Anderson - member of the Minnesota Senate
 Barb Goodwin - former member of the Minnesota Senate
 Tom Hackbarth - former member of the Minnesota House of Representatives
 Jerry Hertaus - member of the Minnesota House of Representatives
 Warren Limmer – member of the Minnesota Senate
 Jessie Ventura - 38th Governor of Minnesota from 1999 to 2003
 Joe Hennig - professional wrestler known in WWE as Curtis Axel

References

External links
 Official website

Two-year colleges in the United States
Educational institutions established in 1966
Universities and colleges in Hennepin County, Minnesota
1966 establishments in Minnesota
Community colleges in Minnesota